Grigory Artemievich Arutinov or Grigor Artemi Harutyunyan (November 7, 1900 – November 9, 1957) was the First Secretary of the Communist Party of the Armenian SSR from 24 September 1937 to 12 March 1953. His tenure as first secretary was the longest in the history of the Armenian SSR.

Early life and career 
Arutinov was born in Telavi, Russian Empire into the family of a small merchant and a winegrower. In 1911 he entered the Russian gymnasium in Telavi. He joined the Russian Social Democratic Labor Party (Bolsheviks) in 1919 and was arrested by the Georgian authorities in 1920.

With the establishment of Soviet power in Georgia, he became the head of the propaganda department of the Telavi district committee of the Communist Party of Georgia. In 1922 he was sent to study in Moscow, at the Karl Marx Moscow Institute of the National Economy. In 1924 he was recalled to Georgia and held various positions in the Communist Party bureaucracy in Georgia, eventually becoming secretary of the Tiflis city party committee in 1934.

Leader of Soviet Armenia 
On September 15, 1937, at an extraordinary plenum of the Central Committee of the Communist Party of Armenia, Arutinov was elected first secretary of the Central Committee of the Communist Party of Armenia. Arutinov's predecessor, Amatuni Amatuni, was arrested on September 23 and later shot. Arutinov was recommended to the position by his boss within the Georgian party structure, Lavrentiy Beria. Arutinov had never lived in Armenia before the appointment nor did he know the Armenian language.

During the Great Purge, Arutinov's brother Sergo and brother-in-law Artyom Geurkov were arrested and shot in Georgia.

During Arutinov's tenure Armenia saw considerable agricultural and industrial expansion, with the capital Yerevan in particular enjoying significant growth and development. The Armenian National Academy of Sciences was founded and the construction of the main building of Matenadaran began. Additionally, from 1946 to 1948 some 100,000 Armenians living in the Armenian diaspora immigrated to Soviet Armenia, although some were settled not in Armenia but in Siberia. In 1945, Arutinov unsuccessfully appealed to Joseph Stalin to attach the Armenian-majority Nagorno-Karabakh Autonomous Oblast, which was part of the Azerbaijan SSR, to Soviet Armenia.

In 1949, under the orders of the Ministry of State Security of the USSR, approximately 12,000 people were forcibly resettled from Armenia to the Altai Krai. After the death of Stalin in 1953, the Central Committee of the Communist Party of Armenia passed a decision to allow the survivors of the deportation to return to Armenia.

After Lavrentiy Beria's arrest in June 1953, Arutinov came under fierce criticism due to his association with Beria. At the meeting of the plenum of the Central Committee of the Communist Party of Armenia on November 28, 1953, he was removed from the post of the first secretary and replaced by Suren Tovmasyan.

After being removed from his post, Arutinov served as chairman of a sovkhoz near Yerevan. He died of a heart attack in Tbilisi in the Georgian SSR on November 9, 1957.

Personal life 
Arutinov was married to Nina Geurkov. They had no children, but adopted Nami Geurkov, the daughter of Nina's brother Artyom Geurkov, who was executed in 1937. Nami Geurkov married Alexey Mikoyan, son of Anastas Mikoyan, and is the mother of Russian musician Stas Namin.

References

Notes

Citations 

1900 births
1957 deaths
People from Telavi
People from Tiflis Governorate
Georgian people of Armenian descent
Armenian atheists
Party leaders of the Soviet Union
First Secretaries of the Armenian Communist Party
First convocation members of the Soviet of the Union
Second convocation members of the Supreme Soviet of the Soviet Union
Third convocation members of the Supreme Soviet of the Soviet Union
Recipients of the Order of Lenin

Recipients of the Order of the Red Banner of Labour